Yellow is the seventh studio album by Japanese rock band Scandal. The album was released on March 2, 2016, and debuted at No. 2 on the Oricon and Billboard Japan weekly charts.

Track listing

Personnel
HARUNA (Haruna Ono) - lead vocals, rhythm guitar
MAMI (Mami Sasazaki) - lead guitar, vocals
TOMOMI (Tomomi Ogawa) - bass, vocals
RINA (Rina Suzuki) - drums, vocals

References

External links
 YELLOW Listing at JPU Records .

2016 albums
Scandal (Japanese band) albums
Epic Records albums
Japanese-language albums